Peter Jordan may refer to:

 Peter Jordan (presenter), Canadian television presenter
 Peter Jordan (actor) (born 1967), German film actor

 Peter G. Jordan, president of Tarrant County College
 Peter Jordan, occasional substitute (and later full time) bass player with the New York Dolls, originally their roadie.